The 1937 All-Pacific Coast football team consists of American football players chosen by various organizations for All-Pacific Coast teams for the 1937 college football season.  The organizations selecting teams in 1937 included the Associated Press (AP), the International News Service (INS), and the United Press (UP).

The 1937 California Golden Bears football team, known as the "Thunder Team," won the Pacific Coast Conference (PCC) championship with a 10-0-1 record, were ranked #2 in the final AP Poll, and defeated Alabama by a 13-0 score in the 1938 Rose Bowl.  Six members of the 1937 California team received first-team honors from the AP, INS, or UP.  The Cal honorees were quarterback Johnny Meek (AP, INS, UP), halfbacks Vic Bottari (INS, UP) and Sam Chapman (AP, INS, UP), end Perry Schwartz (AP, UP), guard Vard Stockton (AP, INS, UP), and center Bob Herwig (AP, INS, UP).

Three players from teams outside the PCC received first-team honors: fullback George Karamatic of the Gonzaga Bulldogs (AP), tackle Alvord Wolff of the Santa Clara Broncos (AP), and guard Dougherty of Santa Clara.

All-Pacific Coast selections

Quarterback
 Johnny Meek, California (AP-1; INS-1; UP-1)
 Schindler, USC (AP-2; UP-2)

Halfbacks
 Sam Chapman, California (AP-1; INS-1; UP-1 [fullback])
 Joe Gray, Oregon State (AP-1; INS-1 [fullback]; UP-1)
 Vic Bottari, California (AP-2; INS-1; UP-1) (College Football Hall of Fame)
 Popovich, Montana (AP-2; UP-2)
 Kenny Washington, UCLA (UP-2)

Fullback
 George Karamatic, Gonzaga (AP-1; UP-2)
 D. Anderson, California (AP-2)

Ends
 Perry Schwartz, California (AP-1; INS-1; UP-1)
 Grant Stone, Stanford (AP-1; INS-1; UP-1)
 Wendlick, Oregon State (AP-2; UP-2)
 Johnson, Washington (AP-2)
 Strode, UCLA (UP-2)

Tackles
 Vic Markov, Washington (AP-1; INS-1; UP-1) (College Football Hall of Fame)
 Pete Zagar, Stanford (AP-2; INS-1; UP-1)
 Alvord Wolff, Santa Clara (AP-1)
 Grimstead, Washington State (AP-2; UP-2)
 Stoll, California (UP-2)

Guards
 Vard Stockton, California (AP-1; INS-1; UP-1)
 Steve Slivinski, Washington (AP-1; UP-1)
 Dougherty, Santa Clara (INS-1)
 Evans, California (AP-2; UP-2)
 Al Hoptowit, Washington State (AP-2; UP-2)

Centers
 Bob Herwig, California (AP-1; INS-1; UP-1) (College Football Hall of Fame)
 Dougherty, Washington State (AP-2; INS-1)
 Bud Erickson, Washington (UP-2)

Key

AP = Associated Press, "selected for the Associated Press by a committee of coaches and football experts"

INS = International News Service, based on ballots cast by "the region's top-notch coaches, officials and writers"

UP = United Press, "chosen by client sporting editors"

Bold = Consensus first-team selection of at least two selectors from the AP, INS, and UP

See also
1937 College Football All-America Team

References

All-Pacific Coast Football Team
All-Pacific Coast football teams
All-Pac-12 Conference football teams